Sefid Aran (also Romanized as Sefīd Ārān; also known as Asfīdārān) is a village in Chendar Rural District, Chendar District, Savojbolagh County, Alborz Province, Iran. At the 2006 census, its population was 32, in 14 families.

History

Etymology 
The word "Sefid" means white and the word "Aran" means trees.

Tourism 
Jose Rood Waterfalls (Persian:جوزه رود, also Romanized as Jōse Rood) is located in Sefid Aran village. There are three picturesque waterfalls in Sefid Aran village.

References 

Populated places in Savojbolagh County